Mike Prestwood Smith is a sound engineer. Smith and his fellow sound engineers are nominated for an Academy Award for Best Sound Mixing for the 2013 film Captain Phillips. He was also nominated for a British Academy Film Award in the category Best Sound for the film Mission: Impossible – Fallout. His nomination was shared with Gilbert Lake, James Mather and Chris Munro.

He has worked on over 100 films since 1996.

References

External links

Living people
American audio engineers
Best Sound BAFTA Award winners
Year of birth missing (living people)